Sheep Lake is an alpine lake in Custer County, Idaho, United States, located in the White Cloud Mountains in the Sawtooth National Recreation Area.  The lake can be accessed from Sawtooth National Forest trail 601.

Sheep Lake is just south of Calkins Peak, northeast of D. O. Lee Peak, and downstream of Slide and Neck Lakes.

References

See also
 List of lakes of the White Cloud Mountains
 Sawtooth National Recreation Area
 White Cloud Mountains

Lakes of Idaho
Lakes of Custer County, Idaho
Glacial lakes of the United States
Glacial lakes of the Sawtooth National Forest